The Division of Fadden is an Australian Electoral Division in Queensland.

Geography
Since 1984, federal electoral division boundaries in Australia have been determined at redistributions by a redistribution committee appointed by the Australian Electoral Commission. Redistributions occur for the boundaries of divisions in a particular state, and they occur every seven years, or sooner if a state's representation entitlement changes or when divisions of a state are malapportioned.

History

The division was created in 1977 and is named after Sir Arthur Fadden, Prime Minister of Australia in 1941. When it was created it included a large area south of Brisbane, from the far south of the city to the Gold Coast hinterland, and was a marginal seat that changed hands between the Liberal Party and Australian Labor Party. A 1984 redistribution pushed it further into Brisbane, and it remained a marginal Liberal seat for most of the 1980s. A 1996 redistribution pushed it into the Gold Coast, and since then it has been a comfortably safe Liberal seat.

By 2004, it had moved almost clear of its original boundaries to become an exclusively Gold Coast seat. It now includes most of the northern Gold Coast, including Coomera, Labrador, Ormeau, Pimpama and Runaway Bay.

Members

Election results

References

External links
 Division of Fadden (Qld) — Australian Electoral Commission

Electoral divisions of Australia
Constituencies established in 1977
1977 establishments in Australia
Fadden